Alken may refer to:

People
Samuel Alken (1756–1815), English engraver
Henry Thomas Alken (1785–1851), English painter and engraver

Places
Alken, Belgium
Alken, Denmark
Alken, Germany

See also 
 Alkan (disambiguation)
 Alkin
 Alkon (disambiguation)
 Alkene[s], unsaturated hydrocarbons that contain at least one carbon-carbon double bond